The Prince of Wales Trophy, also known as the Wales Trophy, is a team award presented by the National Hockey League (NHL). Named for Prince Edward, Prince of Wales (later King Edward VIII and then Duke of Windsor), it has been awarded for different accomplishments throughout its history.

The trophy was first presented during the 1925–26 NHL season to the champion of the first game in Madison Square Garden on December 15, 1925. It was subsequently presented to the champion of the NHL playoffs (including the previous two seasons). The Wales Trophy was then awarded to the champion of the American Division (1927–1938) and later the NHL regular season champions (1938–1967). Since the 1967 NHL expansion, it has served as a counterpart to the Clarence S. Campbell Bowl by using the same criteria in the opposite competitive grouping. The Wales Trophy has been awarded to the East Division regular season champions (1967–1974), the Wales Conference regular season champions (1974–1981), the Wales Conference playoff champions (1981–1993), and the Eastern Conference playoff champions (1993–2020, 2021–present).

Due to a modified playoff format held in 2021 because of the COVID-19 pandemic, the Wales Trophy was awarded to the Tampa Bay Lightning after defeating the New York Islanders in the Stanley Cup Semifinals.

History

The Prince of Wales Trophy was first announced in December 1925. It was sponsored by the then Prince of Wales, Prince Edward, and thus bore the Prince of Wales' feathers and the shield of the Royal Coat of Arms of Canada. Costing $2,500, the trophy was said to be in the possession of the league champion. It was originally awarded to the winner of the first game played in Madison Square Garden, held on December 15, 1925 (Montreal Canadiens 3 at New York Americans 1). The award was then held by the Canadiens until the end of the season. The Canadiens engraved their name on the trophy twice, for the 1924–25 season, and the preceding 1923–24 season, for which the team was league champions.

It was then awarded to the NHL playoff champion in 1925–26 and 1926–27, (along with the O'Brien Cup) before that team would go on to face the Western Hockey League (WHL) champion for the Stanley Cup at the end of those seasons. From the 1927–28 season on, the trophy was awarded to the champion of the American Division of the NHL, while the O'Brien Cup was presented to the Canadian Division champion, until 1938, when, after the NHL reverted to a single division, the Wales Trophy was made the award for the overall regular season champion.

With the expansion of the NHL in 1967, and the creation of the West Division, the Wales Trophy was given to the team that finished in first place in the East Division, during the regular season. When the league formed two conferences in 1974, the trophy transferred to the team that finished with the best regular season record in the Wales Conference, until 1981. The NHL changed its playoff format so that the two conference playoff champions would meet for the Stanley Cup. The Prince of Wales Trophy was presented to the Wales Conference playoff champions. In the summer of 1993 Wales Conference was renamed the Eastern Conference. Prince of Wales trophy has been awarded to the Eastern Conference playoff champions since the 1993–94 season.

A superstition that is prevalent among many of today's NHL players is that no player should either touch or hoist the Wales (Eastern Conference champion) or Clarence S. Campbell (Western Conference champion) Trophies after they have won the conference playoffs; these players feel that the Stanley Cup is the true championship trophy and thus it should be the only trophy that they should be hoisting. Instead of touching the conference trophy, the captain of the winning team merely poses (usually looking solemn) with the trophy, and sometimes, the entire team poses as well. However, there have been other teams who have ignored the superstition and hoisted the conference trophies, sometimes going on to win the Cup anyway. Most notably, the Pittsburgh Penguins who were considered the most successful team to touch the trophy, winning the Stanley Cup five times after touching it.

The NHL abolished the conferences and re-aligned the league into four new divisions for the 2020–21 NHL season due to the COVID-19 pandemic. As a result, the semifinal round of the 2021 Stanley Cup playoffs was contested between the winners of the divisional playoffs and they were seeded according to their regular season record. Initially the trophy was not going to be awarded, but it was later decided that the trophy would be awarded to the winner of the Stanley Cup Semifinals series between the New York Islanders and the Tampa Bay Lightning.

Winners

Key
  – Defunct team
  – Eventual Stanley Cup champions
 a – Engraved in 1925–26.

Original winner
 December 15, 1925 – Montreal Canadiens (Canadiens 3, New York Americans 1)

1923–1925 (pre-donation) engravings
The Canadiens were league champions for these seasons.

NHL playoff champions (1925–1927)

American Division regular season champions (1927–1938)

Regular season champions (1938–1967)

East Division regular season champions (1967–1974)

Wales Conference regular season champions (1974–1981)

Wales Conference playoffs champions (1981–1993)

Eastern Conference playoffs champions (1993–2020)

Stanley Cup Semifinals (2020–2021)

Eastern Conference playoffs champions (2021–present)

See also
 List of National Hockey League awards
 NHL Conference Finals
 Clarence S. Campbell Bowl

References

Notes

Citations

External links
 NHL.com
 History @ Legends of Hockey.net

National Hockey League trophies and awards
Monarchy in Canada
Eastern Conference (NHL)
NHL Conference Finals